Peter Bucknall (born 24 August 1982) is an English rugby union player who plays at tight-head prop for Leicester Tigers in the Aviva Premiership.

Club career

He has previously played for Birmingham & Solihull R.F.C. (2007–08), Coventry R.F.C. (2005–07), and Bracknell (2004–05). He played for Leeds Carnegie from 2008 to 2010 in both National Division One and when they got promoted to the Guinness Premiership, though he underwent a knee operation in February 2009, which put him out of action for some months.

Leicester Tigers signed him for the 2010–11 season.

References

External links
Leicester profile

1982 births
Living people
English rugby union players
Leicester Tigers players
Rugby union props
Rugby union players from Enfield